88th Regiment or 88th Infantry Regiment may refer to:

 88th Regiment of Foot (disambiguation), several units of the British Army
 88th Heavy Anti-Aircraft Regiment, Royal Artillery
 88 Postal and Courier Regiment RLC, Royal Logistics Corps
 88th Fighter-Bomber Aviation Regiment, a unit of the Yugoslav Air Force
 88th Infantry Regiment (United States)
 88th Carnatic Infantry, a unit of the British Indian Army

Union Army (American Civil War):
 88th Illinois Infantry Regiment
 88th Indiana Infantry Regiment
 88th New York Infantry
 88th Pennsylvania Infantry Regiment

See also 
 88th Division (disambiguation)